Timo Bernd Hübers (born 20 July 1996) is a German professional footballer who plays as a defender for Bundesliga club 1. FC Köln.

References

External links
 Profile on DFB.de

1996 births
Living people
Sportspeople from Hildesheim
Footballers from Lower Saxony
German footballers
Association football defenders
1. FC Köln II players
Hannover 96 II players
Hannover 96 players
1. FC Köln players
Bundesliga players
Regionalliga players